Valerie Ramey is an American economist at University of California, San Diego and an Elected Fellow of the American Academy of Arts & Sciences.

In 2018, she was elected a fellow of the Econometric Society. She is a member of the American Academy of Arts and Sciences and research associate at the NBER. She was awarded the R. K. Cho Economics Prize in 2020.

Career and research 
Ramey has a BA in economics and Spanish from the University of Arizona (1981) and a PhD in economics from Stanford University (1987).

She is an associate editor of the Journal of Political Economy.

Her works have been cited over 15,000 times according to Google Scholar. Her research has been quoted in CNN, the New York Times and the Wall Street Journal.

References

External links 

Year of birth missing (living people)
Living people
University of California, San Diego faculty
Economists from California
University of Arizona alumni
Stanford University alumni
Economists from Arizona
American women economists
20th-century American economists
21st-century American economists
Fellows of the American Academy of Arts and Sciences
Fellows of the Econometric Society
20th-century American women
21st-century American women